Mazeirat is a commune in the Creuse department in the Nouvelle-Aquitaine region in central France.

Geography

Population

Sights
 The church, dating from the twelfth century.
 The ruins of a castle at Mas de Ceydoux.

See also
Communes of the Creuse department

References

Communes of Creuse

kk:Мазера